Edmond Lepelletier (26 June 1846 – 22 July 1913) was a French journalist, a prolific popular novelist and a politician.
He is known for his lifelong friendship with Paul Verlaine.
He was initially a radical, fought for the Paris Commune, and wrote for republican journals.
Later he abandoned his friends and became nationalist and antisemitic.

Early years

Lepelletier was born on 26 June 1846 in Paris.
He was born in the Monceau district of Batignolles.
He received a classical education at the Lycée Bonaparte (now the Lycée Condorcet), then enrolled in the Faculty of Law, where he gained a Bachelor's degree.
He never pleaded as a lawyer, and later became a publicist.
He married, and was the father of the playwright Saint-Georges de Bouhélier and of the wife of René Viviani.
He fought 17 duels, was wounded, and only retained his limbs thanks to the surgeon Jules-Émile Péan.
He defended the surgeon obstinately when he was viciously attacked by the press.

Toward the end of the Second French Empire Lepelletier was condemned for attacks on Baron Haussmann, prefect of the Seine.
In the Sainte-Pélagie Prison he met Louis Charles Delescluze, later military commander of the Paris Commune, the writer Jules Vallès, Raoul Rigault and other future supporters of the Commune.
In 1867 he became a political journalist, writing in the Nain Jaune of Paris.
He contributed to the Peuple souverain, Suffrage universel, Patriote français, Rappel à l'homme libre, Droits de l'homme, Radical, Marseillaise, Mot d'ordre and finally to L'Écho de Paris.
Lepelletier became known for his novels, mainly drawn from dramatic works, including Le Capitaine Angot (1875), Le chien du commissaire (1876), Ivan le nihiliste (1880), L'Amant de cœur (1884) and Laï-tou (1885).
They were written with the same brisk, colorful style that was found in his political articles.

Radical

During the Franco-Prussian War (1870) Lepelletier enlisted in the 69th line regiment, then joined the 110th, and took part in the defense of Paris with his regiment.
He was a delegate to the Council of State of the Paris Commune.
For this, he was arrested after the Commune was repressed and held in preventative detention for a long time before being sentenced to one month's imprisonment.
He wrote later in his history of the Commune, "An idea germinated in the blood-soaked fields of Paris: Paris was to be free and autonomous, it was to practice the dictatorship of example, to serve as model for cities, provinces, states and kingdoms. Paris as a focal point of democracy and the center of social progress was, first of all, to become the capital of the united states of Europe and then to be the Rome of a universal federation of nations."

Lepelletier was a friend of Verlaine until his death, and wrote his biography.
Lepelletier recalled that Paul Verlaine (1844–96) was infatuated with Arthur Rimbaud, a very affected young man, and imposed him on all his friends.
In 1871, the day after Verlaine and Rimbaud had flaunted their relationship in the Odéon Theatre lobby, Lepelletier wrote in his gossip column that, "Paul Verlaine was arm-in-arm with a charming young lady, Mlle. Rimbaut."
At dinner a few days later Rimbaut threatened Lepelletier with a steak knife.
Lepelletier wrote that he threw the boy back into his chair, saying that in the recent war he had not been afraid of Prussians, and now he was not going to be bothered by a little troublemaker like Rimbaud.
He thought Verlaine's addiction to absinthe "undermined his moral and cerebral stamina, and eventually led to his social and even intellectual downfall."
He helped Verlaine in his last moments, and took care of his family.

Le Pelletier held very radical views, but they moderated when he began writing for l'Echo de Paris.
For many years he was an active propagandist of Freemasonry, and held a high rank in this movement. 
In January 1882 he founded a Freemasons lodge, Les Droits de l'homme (Human Rights).
This quickly became one of the most brilliant and active lodges in the Grand Orient de France.
In 1888 he was made a Knight of the Legion of Honour.
During a meeting of the Cirque d'Hiver in 1889 he laid the foundations for the great Republican Union movement that defeated Boulangism.

In the legislative elections of 4 October 1889 the Blanquists and Boulangists cooperated, dividing the electoral districts of Paris between the two parties.
Lepelletier ran as Republican candidate for the Seine for the 2nd constituency of the 17th arrondissement of Paris but was defeated in the first round by the Blanquist Ernest Roche, who won 8,953 votes against 7,758 for Lepelletier.
He was an anti-revoluationary candidate again in 1893 in the 2nd constituency of the 17th arrondissement of Paris.
He was again defeated by Ernest Roche.
He was appointed a justice of the peace for the canton of Marly in 1889, but was dismissed in 1899.

Nationalist

In 1898 Lepelletier completely abandoned the Republican majority to join the Nationalists.
In 1899 he was President of the International Congress of the Press in Rome.
He resigned from Freemasonry, left his political friends and ran successfully in the 1900 Paris municipal election for the Batignolles district as an antisemitic candidate. 
As an editor at l'Echo de Paris he strongly opposed review of the Dreyfus trial.
In the municipal council of Paris and the Seine General Council he voted with the Nationalist majority.
On 11 May 1902 he ran for election as a Nationalist Republican in the 2nd constituency of the 17y arrondissement of Paris, and was elected in the second round.
He was decisively defeated in the 1906 general elections,
He left office on 31 May 1906.

Lepelletier  died on 22 July 1913 in Vittel, Vosges.

Publications

Publications by Edmond Lepelletier include:

Notes

Sources

1846 births
1913 deaths
Writers from Paris
Politicians from Paris
French nationalists
Members of the 8th Chamber of Deputies of the French Third Republic
19th-century French poets
19th-century French journalists
19th-century French novelists